Duncan Fisher (17 July 1962 – 23 December 1984) was an Australian rower. He competed in the men's coxless four event at the 1984 Summer Olympics. He was killed in a car crash.

References

External links
 

1962 births
1984 deaths
Australian male rowers
Olympic rowers of Australia
Rowers at the 1984 Summer Olympics
Place of birth missing
Road incident deaths in Australia
20th-century Australian people